Astralium, common name star snails, is a genus of sea snails, marine gastropod mollusks in the family Turbinidae, the turban snails and star snails.

Description
In Astralium a very rapidly enlarging whorl starts from the multispiral nucleus, forming far the greater portion of the operculum, and usually leaving a pit at the starting point.

Distribution
This marine genus has a wide distribution ranging from the Eastern Indian Ocean to China and Japan, the Philippines, Indonesia, East India, the Maldives and Australia (New South Wales, Northern Territory, Queensland, South Australia, Tasmania, Victoria, Western Australia).

Species
According to the World Register of Marine Species (WoRMS), the following species are included within the genus Astralium :
 Astralium asteriscum (Reeve, 1843)
 Astralium calcar (Linnaeus, 1758)
 Astralium confragosum (Gould, 1851)
 Astralium danieli (Alf & Kreipl, 2006)
 Astralium dekkeri (Thach, 2018)
 Astralium haematragum (Menke, 1829)
 Astralium heimburgi (Dunker, 1882)
 Astralium lapillus Reeve, 1863
 Astralium latispina (Philippi, 1844)
 Astralium milloni (B. Salvat, F. Salvat & Richard, 1973)
 Astralium nakamineae (Habe & Okutani, 1981)
 Astralium okamotoi Kuroda & Habe, 1961
 Astralium pileolum (Reeve, 1842)
 Astralium provisorium Schepman, 1908
 Astralium rhodostomum (Lamarck, 1822)
 Astralium rotularium (Lamarck, 1822)
 Astralium saturnum Chino, 1999
 Astralium semicostatum (Kiener, 1850)
 Astralium stellare (Gmelin, 1791)
 Astralium tentoriiforme (Jonas, 1845)
 Astralium tentorium (Thiele, 1930)
 Astralium wallisi (Iredale, 1937)

Another number of species  are also mentioned in the Indo-Pacific  Molluscan Database :
 Astralium (Astralium) loochooensis (Mcneil, 1960): Possibly mistook of Buccinaria loochooensis MacNeil, 1961, the nearest match.
 Astralium turcicus Reeve, 1848
 Astralium yamamurae Habe & Kosuge, 1966

Species brought into synonymy
 Astralium abyssorum Schepman, 1908: synonym of Bolma henica (Watson, 1885)
 Astralium americanum (Gmelin, 1791): synonym of Lithopoma americanum (Gmelin, 1791)
 Astralium andersoni E.A. Smith, 1902: synonym of Bolma andersoni (E. A. Smith, 1902)
 Astralium aureolum Hedley, 1907: synonym of Bolma aureola (Hedley, 1907)
 Astralium aureum (Jonas, 1844): synonym of Bellastraea aurea (Jonas, 1844)
 Astralium bathyrhaphe Smith, 1899: synonym of Bolma bathyraphis (E. A. Smith, 1899)
 Astralium brevispina (Lamarck, 1822): synonym of Lithopoma brevispina (Lamarck, 1822)
 Astralium cepoides E.A. Smith, 1880: synonym of Turbo cepoides E.A. Smith, 1880
 Astralium deplanatum Link, H.F., 1807: synonym of Lithopoma phoebium (Röding, 1798)
 Astralium fimbriatum Tryon, 1888: synonym of Bellastraea squamifera (Iredale, 1924)
 Astralium gilchristi G.B. Sowerby III, 1903: synonym of Bolma bathyraphis (E. A. Smith, 1899)
 Astralium guadeloupense Crosse, H., 1865: synonym of Lithopoma tectum (Lightfoot, 1786)
 Astralium johnstoni Odhner, 1923: synonym of  Bolma johnstoni (Odhner, 1923)
 Astralium mactanense Habe & Okutani, 1980: synonym of Astralium lapillus Reeve, 1863
 Astralium moniliferum Hedley & Willey, 1896: synonym of  Guildfordia monilifera (Hedley & Willey, 1896)
 Astralium phoebium (Röding, 1798): synonym of Lithopoma phoebium (Röding, 1798)
 Astralium plicatospinosum Pilsbry, 1889: synonym of Astralium confragosum (Gould, 1851)
 Astralium roseobasis Kreipl & Dekker, 2003: synonym of Astralium provisorium (Schepman, 1903)
 Astralium rutidoloma (Tate, 1893)  synonym of Bellastraea rutidoloma (Tate, 1893)
 Astralium semicostatum (P. Fischer, 1875): synonym of Astralium semicostatum (Kiener, 1850)
 Astralium squamiferum (Koch, 1844): synonym of Bellastraea squamifera (Koch, 1844)
 Astralium tayloriana Odhner, 1923: synonym of  Bolma tayloriana (E. A. Smith, 1880)
 Astralium titania Röding, P.F., 1798: synonym of Lithopoma phoebium (Röding, 1798)
 Astralium triumphans (Philippi, 1841): synonym of Guildfordia triumphans (Philippi, 1841)
 Astralium tuberosum (Philippi): synonym of Astralium rhodostomum (Lamarck, 1822)
 Astralium (Bolma) modestus var. girgyllus (Reeve, 1843): synonym of Bolma modesta (Reeve, 1843)

References

External links
 
 Link, D. H. F. (1807-1808). Beschreibung der Naturalien-Sammlung der Universität zu Rostock. Rostock, Adlers Erben. 1 Abt. [Part 1], pp. 1–50; 2 Abt. [Part 2], pp. 51–100; 3 Abt. [Part 3], pp. 101–165; Abt. 4 [Part 4],pp. 1–30; Abt. 5 [Part 5], pp. 1–38 [1808]; Abt. 6 [Part 6], pp. 1–38

 
Turbinidae
Gastropod genera